The Lakin Baronetcy, of The Cliff in the Borough of Warwick, is a title in the Baronetage of the United Kingdom. It was created on 22 July 1909 for Michael Lakin. He was mayor of Warwick, Vice-chairman of the Warwickshire County Council and High Sheriff of Warwickshire.

Lakin baronets, of The Cliff (1909)
Sir Michael Henry Lakin, 1st Baronet (1846–1931)
Sir Richard Lakin, 2nd Baronet (1873–1955)
Sir Henry Lakin, 3rd Baronet (1904–1979)
Sir Michael Lakin, 4th Baronet (1934–2014) 
Sir Richard Anthony Lakin, 5th Baronet (born 1968)

The heir apparent is the present holder's only son Henry Anthony Lakin (born 1999).

Notes

References
Kidd, Charles, Williamson, David (editors). Debrett's Peerage and Baronetage (1990 edition). New York: St Martin's Press, 1990, 

Lakin